Michael Dougall Bell (September 10, 1943 – August 24, 2017) was a Canadian Foreign Service Officer with 36 years experience in the Department of Foreign Affairs, mostly focused on the Middle East. He was Canada's Ambassador to Jordan (1987–90), Egypt (1994–98), and Israel (1990–92 and 1999–2003).  He was also Chair of the Donor Committee of the International Reconstruction Fund Facility for Iraq.

Early life 

Bell was born on September 10, 1943 in Windsor, Ontario.  He attended Assumption College School from 1958–1962, and later attended the University of Windsor.  At Windsor he received his B.A. Hons (1966) and M.A. (1967) in Political Science and Economic Studies.

Foreign Service 

After completing his M.A. he joined the Canadian Foreign Service, holding early positions in Kingston, Jamaica (1968–1970), Port of Spain, Trinidad and Tobago (1970–1972), and Rome, Italy (1981–1983).  He Also Served as the Senior Political Officer in Tel Aviv, Israel from 1975 to 1978.  He was Executive Assistant for Middle East Affairs to the Honourable Robert Stanfield (1978–1979), and Director of the Middle East Relations Division (1983–1987), Director General for Central and Eastern Europe (1992–1994). He served as Canadian Ambassador to Egypt, Jordan and Israel (twice), as well as High Commissioner to Cyprus. He was also an Arms Inspector for UNSCOM for a short period.

After the Foreign Service 

Bell served as the Fellow at the Weatherhead Centre for International Affairs at Harvard University (1998–99) and from 2003-2005 he was Senior Scholar on Diplomacy at the Munk Centre for International Studies, at the University of Toronto. Afterwards, Bell joined the Norman Paterson School of International Affairs at Carleton University and the Paul Martin (Sr.) Senior Scholar in International Diplomacy, University of Windsor, where he taught until his death. 

Bell has been a contributor to The Globe and Mail. He has also published in the Literary Review of Canada, the Behind the Headlines series of the Canadian Institute of International Affairs, Ideas: the Arts and Science Review of the University of Toronto, the International Journal, and the Journal of International Law and International Relations.

Later work 

Michael Bell was the Paul Martin (Sr.) Senior Scholar on International Diplomacy at the University of Windsor, where he taught on the law and politics of the modern Middle East. He was also engaged in a major study on the future governance of Jerusalem's Old City.  The project is designed to stimulate thinking amongst decision makers, respecting options for the future governance of the old city for possible use by negotiators, in the event of renewed negotiations for a comprehensive peace between Israelis and Palestinians. Critics note that this activity was detached from regional realities, "misguided" and unhelpful.

He died of liver cancer on 24 August 2017.

Political activity

Bell joined a Justin Trudeau initiative "to help him persuade voters he has the foreign policy chops to be prime minister in 2015", which was unveiled on 16 December 2014 in the lead-up to the 2015 Canadian election.  The group of 14 experts included several candidates for office, a Calgary-based lawyer who advocates for Chinese state-owned enterprises, and another lawyer who wrote "lamenting the lack of diversity and women in positions of power in corporate Canada".  In the months between the two events, he was interviewed on the P5+1 Iran deal and said:

and he has written in The Globe and Mail pieces such as:
 "To respond to terror, we must distinguish its three varieties", 13 January 2015
 "Why a weakened IS gives Harper a political boost", 12 February 2015
 "Israel will pay a price for Netanyahu’s Iran obsession", 5 March 2015
 "Another round of Netanyahu – for Israelis and the world", 18 March 2015
 "Lost in the headlines: Another tragedy looms in Lebanon", 14 April 2015
 "Jordan needs more than muscle", 30 April 2015

References

External links 

 Foreign Affairs and International Trade Canada Complete List of Posts
 Michael Bell's Website at the University of Windsor
http://uwindsor.ca/jerusaleminitiative

1943 births
2017 deaths
Harvard University staff
Ambassadors of Canada to Jordan
Ambassadors of Canada to Israel
High Commissioners of Canada to Cyprus
Ambassadors of Canada to Egypt
People from Windsor, Ontario
University of Windsor alumni